The Shubert Theatre is a theatre in Boston, Massachusetts, at 263-265 Tremont Street in the Boston Theater District. It opened on January 24, 1910, with a production of Shakespeare's The Taming of the Shrew starring E. H. Sothern and Julia Marlowe. Architect Thomas M. James (Hill, James, & Whitaker) designed the building, which seats approximately 1,600 people. Originally conceived as The Lyric Theatre by developer Charles H. Bond, it was taken over by The Shubert Organization in 1908 after Bond's death.

The building was added to the National Register of Historic Places in 1980. In February 1996, the Wang Center signed a 40-year lease agreement to operate the theatre with the Shubert Organization, which continues to own the building and property; the theatre reopened after renovation in November 1996, as the first stop on the First National Tour of RENT. The Boch family became the namesake of the center in 2016, making the full name of the theatre the Shubert Theatre at the Boch Center.

Pre-Broadway engagements

See also 
 National Register of Historic Places listings in northern Boston, Massachusetts

References
Notes

External links

 Boston Public Library, Special Collections. William B. Jackson Theater Collection. Includes materials related to the Shubert Theatre, 1910-1989
 Library of Congress. Drawing of New Shubert Theatre, Tremont St. opposite Hollis St., Boston, Massachusetts, 1929.
 New York Public Library:
 Flyer promoting the pre-Broadway booking (2 weeks beginning Monday November 7, 1938) of The Boys From Syracuse at the Shubert Theatre (Boston, Mass.)
 Flyer advertising Too Many Girls opening at the Shubert Theatre (Boston, Mass.) (1939)
 Program (May 11-23, 1942) for All's Fair, the pre-Broadway title for By Jupiter, at the Shubert Theatre (Boston, Mass.)
 Bostonian Society:
 Photo of 263-265 Tremont Street, c. 1943
 Photo of interior of Shubert Theater, c. 1935-50
 Photo of interior of Shubert Theater, 20th century
 Photo of 263-265 Tremont Street, c. 1957
 Photo of 255-275 Tremont Street, c. 1959
 Boston Athenæum Theater History. Shubert Theatre (1910- ), 265 Tremont Street

1910 establishments in Massachusetts
Shubert Organization
Culture of Boston
Theatres in Boston
Theatres on the National Register of Historic Places in Massachusetts
Boston Theater District
Theatres completed in 1910
National Register of Historic Places in Boston